Port-à-Piment is a commune in the Côteaux Arrondissement, in the Sud department of Haiti. In 2009, the commune had a population of 17,207.

Settlements
Port-à-Piment
Dolian

References

Populated places in Sud (department)
Communes of Haiti